Porcellio siculoccidentalis is a species of woodlouse in the genus Porcellio (family Porcellionidae), which is endemic to western Sicily.

References

Porcellionidae
Woodlice of Europe
Endemic arthropods of Sicily
Crustaceans described in 1992